Winnebago Township may refer to one of the following places in the United States:

 Winnebago Township, Winnebago County, Illinois
 Winnebago Township, Houston County, Minnesota
 Winnebago Township, Thurston County, Nebraska

See also

Winnebago (disambiguation)

Township name disambiguation pages